Dr. Anand Gollahalli Shivaprasad, also known as Dr. G. S. Anand (born 19 October 1973), better known by stage name Siddhanth, is an Indian actor appears in Kannada cinema. He is a medical doctor by profession.

Early life and education 
Siddhanth was born to Gangambika and Dr G. Shivaprasad as a second child, he was named Anand G. S., brought up in a village called Gollahalli (now renamed as Siddhartha Nagar) in Tumkur. His Primary & Secondary education, was at Sarvodaya School in Tumkur, followed by P. U. College from Sarvodaya P. U. College and then went on to study M.B.B.S. in JJM Medical College, Davangere,  Later, he obtained an M.H.A. Degree from the University of Leeds in the United Kingdom.

Career

Administrative career 
After his studies, he came back to India, to look after Sri Siddartha Dental College as Administrative Officer. Later, he became a member to Sri Siddhartha Education Society, which was run by his family.

Film career 
He started acting from 2008 as the main lead in Minchu.

Siddhanth’s Shankaracharya film with Duniya Vijay was stopped in the controversial started by Akhila Karnataka Brahmana Maha Sabha and Sringeri Mutt  objections to the title by filing the complaint before Karnataka Film Chamber of Commerce.

Personal life 
Siddhanth married his childhood friend Malini and has a son named Rishon. Siddhanth is the nephew to Dr G. Parameshwara.

Filmography

References 

21st-century Indian male actors
Male actors in Kannada cinema
People from Tumkur
1973 births
Living people
Male actors from Karnataka
Kannada film producers